Hey Girl may refer to:

Film, TV and theatre
 Hey Girl (TV series) a TV show on MTV
 Hey Girl (play), a nontraditional theater piece by Italian director Romeo Castellucci

Music
 Hey Girl (group), a Taiwanese Mandopop group
 Hey Girl! Records, is a music label based on Madrid De Los Trillos, Spain

Songs
 "Hey Girl" (Anne Wilson song)
 "Hey Girl" (Billy Currington song)
 "Hey Girl" (Delays song)
 "Hey Girl"  (Freddie Scott song), written by Gerry Goffin and Carole King, covered by Billy Joel and several other artists
 "Hey Girl" (Small Faces song)
 "Hey Girl (This Is Our Time)", by CDB
 "Hey Girl", by Estelle from The 18th Day
 "Hey Girl", by Hardline from II
 "Hey Girl", by Justin Bieber from Believe
 "Hey Girl", by Lady Gaga featuring Florence Welch from Joanne
 "Hey Girl", by O.A.R. from In Between Now and Then
 "Hey Girl", by Them featuring Van Morrison from Them Again
 "Hey Girl", by Zooey Deschanel and used as the theme song of the sitcom New Girl